Marco Pilato (born 14 April 1973 in Italy) is an Italian retired footballer.

Career

At the age of 18, Pilato debuted for Bologna in the Serie A, where he was a reference point for future international goalkeeper Gianluigi Buffon. However, he retired from professional football at age 21 because he felt that "there was no respect, only money dominated, while application and the desire to learn were not considered". After that, Pilato played in the Bologna amateur leagues, operating as a defender, midfielder, or forward.

References

External links
 Marco Pilato at Carriere calciatori

Italian footballers
Association football defenders
Association football midfielders
Association football forwards
Association football goalkeepers
Living people
1973 births
Footballers from Bologna
Bologna F.C. 1909 players
A.C. Trento 1921 players